The 1982–83 Wright State Raiders men's basketball team represented Wright State University during the 1982–83 NCAA Division II men's basketball season. The Raiders, led by head coach Ralph Underhill, played their home games at the Wright State Physical Education Building in Dayton, Ohio. They were the 1983 NCAA Division II national champions.

Roster 

Source

Schedule and results

|-
!colspan=12 style=|Regular season

|-

|-

|-

|-

|-

|-

|-

|-

|-

|-

|-

|-

|-

|-

|-

|-

|-

|-

|-

|-

|-

|-

|-

|-

|-

|-

|-
!colspan=12 style=| NCAA tournament
|-

|-

|-

|-

|-

Sources

Awards and honors

Statistics

Source

References

Wright State Raiders men's basketball seasons
Wright State
NCAA Division II men's basketball tournament championship seasons
Wright State Raiders men's basketball